Illinois elected its United States Representative at-Large on a general ticket upon achieving statehood December 3, 1818.  It last elected a US Representative in the Election of 1946.  The district has been inactive since.

List of members representing the district

1818–1833: One seat 

From statehood to 1833, Illinois had only one congressional district, and therefore it was at-large.

1863–1873: One seat 

From 1863 to 1873 there was one at-large seat in addition to the districted seats.

1893–1895: Two seats 

From 1893 to 1895, there were two at-large seats in addition to the districted seats.

1913–1949: Two seats, then one 

Two at-large seats were re-established March 4, 1913. From that date to January 3, 1943, there were two at-large seats, which was reduced to one seat from 1943 to 1949. Representation by districts also continued during this period. The at-large seat was abolished effective January 3, 1949.

Notes

References

 Congressional Biographical Directory of the United States 1774–present

See also
 Illinois Territory's at-large congressional district

At-large
Former congressional districts of the United States
At-large United States congressional districts
Constituencies established in 1813
1813 establishments in Illinois
Constituencies disestablished in 1833
1833 disestablishments in Illinois
Constituencies established in 1863
1863 establishments in Illinois
Constituencies disestablished in 1873
1873 disestablishments in Illinois
Constituencies established in 1893
1893 establishments in Illinois
Constituencies disestablished in 1895
1895 disestablishments in Illinois
Constituencies established in 1913
1913 establishments in Illinois
Constituencies disestablished in 1949
1949 disestablishments in Illinois